Trebgast is a municipality in Bavaria, Germany.

Trebgast may also refer to:
 TSV Trebgast, a German association football club from the municipality
 Trebgast (White Main), a river of Bavaria, Germany, tributary of the White Main